Like Dogs is a 2021 American horror thriller film written and directed by Randy Van Dyke and starring Annabel Barrett and Ignacyo Matynia.

Cast
Annabel Barrett as Lisa
Ignacyo Matynia as Adam
Ryan Q. Tran as George
Shay Denison as Erica
Katy Dore as Dr. Fischer

Reception
Evan Dossey of the Midwest Film Journal gave the film a positive review and wrote, "It is, frankly, one of the most gleefully repellent single-set horror films I’ve watched in a long time. I ate it up like a dog and I’d go back for seconds."

References

External links
 
 

2021 horror films
2021 horror thriller films